Prometon is a herbicide for annual and perennial broad-leaf weed, brush and grass control mainly in non-cropping situations.

References
 Prometon Risk Assessments; Notice of Availability, and Risk Reduction Options. Federal Register: November 7, 2007 (Volume 72, Number 215)
Scorecard – CHEMICAL PROFILES – Chemical Profile – Chemical: 	PROMETON – CAS Number: 	1610-18-0

External links
 

Herbicides
Triazines
Isopropylamino compounds